Xylergates capixaba is a species of beetle in the family Cerambycidae. It was described by Giorgi and Corbett in 2005.

References

Acanthocinini
Beetles described in 2005